Progomphus bellei, the Belle's Sanddragon, is a species of dragonfly in the family Gomphidae. It is endemic to the United States.  Its natural habitats are rivers and freshwater lakes.

References 

Insects of the United States
Gomphidae
Taxonomy articles created by Polbot
Insects described in 1980